Shibli Sadik (9 January 1941 – 7 January 2010) was a Bangladeshi film director. He won National Film Awards and Bachsas Awards.

Career
Sadik started his career as an assistant director with Mustafizur Rahman. His notable films are Nolok, Jibon Niye Juya, Tin Kanya, Dolna, Bheja Chokh, Achena, Ma Mati Desh, Ananda Ashru, Mayer Adhikkar, and Antore Antore. In 2006, his last directed film Bideshini was released.

Filmography

Death 
Sadick died from prostate cancer on 7 January 2010 . After the funeral, he was buried at Banani Graveyard alongside his parents.

References

External links 
 

1941 births
2010 deaths
People from Naogaon District
Bangladeshi film directors
Best Screenplay National Film Award (Bangladesh) winners